Ashley Philip Dykes is a Welsh adventurer and extreme athlete. He achieved two official world-first records, trekking across Mongolia and Madagascar, before the age of 25. In August 2019, he achieved his third official record, becoming the first person to walk along the full  course of the Yangtze, the longest river in Asia.

Personal life
Dykes grew up in Old Colwyn, Wales. and also attended Ysgol Bryn Elian situated within the town.

Career
He worked as a lifeguard to finance his first trip to China. He walked solo and unsupported across Mongolia in 2014, aged 23. The  journey over the Altai Mountains and across the Gobi Desert took 78 days. He became known to locals as the "lonely snow leopard". In 2015 he completed the  trek across Madagascar via its eight highest peaks, another world first. Along the way, he contracted the deadliest strain of malaria and was close to death. As a result of the experience, he is now a special ambassador for the charity Malaria No More UK. In August 2018, he embarked on another world-first record attempt, to walk the  course of the Yangtze river. The successful completion of his year-long mission earned him celebrity status in China.

He recounted his adventures in Mongolia and Madagascar in Mission Possible: A Decade of Living Dangerously, published by Eye Books in 2017.

Awards
He won the 2016 Welsh Adventurer of the Year Award. He has been named the seventh-coolest person in Wales and was described as "one of the world’s most fearless outdoor men" by FHM magazine.

References

External links 
 

1990 births
Living people
Sportspeople from Conwy County Borough
Welsh explorers
Welsh male athletes